Adanech Anbesa Feyisa (born January 23, 1998) is an Ethiopian sprinter who specializes in the 1500 meters.

Biography and sprinting career
She won the bronze medal in the 1500 meters at the 2016 African Championships in Durban, breaking her personal best 4 min 5 s 22.

Personal bests

External links
 Adanech Anbesa at OmRiyadat English
 

1998 births
Living people
Athletes (track and field) at the 2019 African Games
African Games competitors for Ethiopia
Ethiopian female sprinters